Jules Jean-Louis Gounon (born 31 December 1994 in Aubenas) is an Andorran-based French professional racing driver. He is best known for his victories in the 24 Hours of Spa in 2017 and 2022, and the Bathurst 12 Hour in 2020, 2022 and 2023.

Career

1994-2015: Youth in karting, single-seaters and Porsche Carrera Cup 
Jules Gounon is the son of the former racing driver Jean-Marc Gounon, who finished second in the 24 Hours of Le Mans in 1997. He started karting in 2010 at the age of 15. He was crowned Rotax National French Champion in 2011. In the year after, he clinched the X30 world title. He was promoted to single-seaters, joining the French F4 Championship for the 2013 season and finished second with six wins. He competed one year in Formula Renault 2.0, but failed to impress as he "could not get on well with the team". As his career seemed to be in a deadlock after a difficult 2014 season, he was selected "Espoir Porsche Carrera Cup France 2015" to take part in Porsche Carrera Cup France for the next season with a grant of €30,000. He scored his maiden win in the championship in Val de Vienne and finished sixth in the final standings.

2016-2017: Success in German GT and win in the 24 Hours of Spa
In 2016, he joined Callaway Competition in ADAC GT Masters, the German championship of GT. He drove a brand new Corvette C7 GT3-R with his teammate Daniel Keilwitz. Callaway ran three Corvette for this season. He won three times and put himself in title contention for the last event. However, Jules Gounon suffered a big crash at Hockenheim, staying conscious and alert, but with an injured (although not broken) left leg. Finally he stood third in the final standings while developing his new car during the year. Callaway Competition decided to run only the car of Gounon and Keilwitz for the 2017 season. He scored his first win of the season in Red Bull Ring. After this round, his teammate Keilwitz got injured and was replaced by Renger van der Zande who won with Gounon in Zandvoort, letting the Frenchman take alone the championship's lead. He then had two difficult weekends without podium with Albert Costa and van der Zende. However, he won his third race of the season in Hockenheim after the return of Keilwitz to competition. This last win let him seal the title in the last event. He also clinched the Junior title for drivers under 25.

Also engaged with Jean-Luc Beaubelique and Nico Bastian in Blancpain GT Series Endurance Cup (Pro-Am Cup), he took two podiums. He was recruited by Audi Sport Team Saintéloc for the 2017 24 Hours of Spa, the greatest race of GT, teaming up with Christopher Haase and Markus Winkelhock. Despite running one lap down in the first half of the race because of a mis-threaded wheel, Gounon and his teammates came back in front. He battled with a Bentley in the last hours and created an 11-second gap with it to win the biggest victory in his career. This 2017 edition was very tight as six cars arrived in the same lap as the leader.

2018-2020: Official factory driver for Bentley
In 2018, Jules Gounon at the age of 22, was signed by Bentley M-Sport as an official factory driver for Blancpain GT Series Endurance Cup and Intercontinental GT Challenge, replacing Oliver Jarvis. With Steven Kane and Guy Smith, the Frenchman had to develop the new Bentley Continental GT3 which replaced the former generation. In Paul Ricard, he scored his maiden podium with Bentley finishing second. He missed the win because of a bonnet problem. For the 2018 24 Hours of Spa, he had to leave the race after some braking problems. He also did a one-off in Super GT for the Fuji 500-mile race. He finished thirteenth which represented the best result of the team that season in the Japanese championship. Jules Gounon said about that 2018 season: "I have progressed and learnt a lot. [...] I had to get used with a new car. The target was to have a good car at the end of the season. Unfortunately, we had a lack of speed in straight lines. With this new Continental GT3, Bentley started again from the beginning. 2018 was a season of development. After more than two years of work with German people, I discovered another vision of motorsport with a different way of working. The Bentley Continental GT3 will have a say in 2019".

For the centenary of Bentley in 2019, Jules Gounon was engaged in Blancpain GT Series Endurance Cup and Intercontinental GT Challenge with Steven Kane and Jordan Pepper. After two complicated races, the Frenchman set the fastest time of the qualifying session in Paul Ricard, faster than his teammates and than his rivals. Battling with the Ferrari 488 GT3 of Miguel Molina, Jules Gounon and Bentley won their first race of the year and also their first win since the introduction of their new car back in 2018. Two weeks later, Jules Gounon participated in his first 24 Hours of Le Mans with Risi Competizione, teaming up with Oliver Jarvis and Pipo Derani on a Ferrari 488 GTE Evo. Qualified 17th in the category LMGTE Pro, they finished 11th in this category and 40th overall, despite a mechanical problem in the last hours of the race.

Since 2021: GT World Challenge success with Mercedes

2021 
2021 would see Gounon become a works driver for the Mercedes team, as he took part in the GT World Challenge Europe Endurance Cup with Daniel Juncadella and Raffaele Marciello. A strong start with a podium in Monza and a sixth place in Le Castellet was followed by disappointment at Spa, where the outfit was forced to retire, having previously taken pole position. The team ended their campaign positively, appearing on the rostrum in the final two races, which included a win at the season finale, ultimately putting Gounon second overall.

2022 
Gounon teamed up with Juncadella and Marciello once more at the rebranded AKKodis ASP Team for the 2022 season of the Endurance Cup. Having taken the overall victory at the 24 Hours of Spa, the Frenchman and his teammates ended up winning the championship at the end of the year, beating out Antonio Fuoco by a mere two points.

During the same year, Gounon raced in the ADAC GT Masters alongside junior driver Fabian Schiller. The pair finished third in the standings, amassing four wins and a further podium.

2023 
Having switched to an Andorran racing license at the start of 2023, Gounon began the campaign in fine style, grabbing a class victory at the 24 Hours of Daytona and following that up by winning the Bathurst 12 Hour race outright for a record-breaking third year in a row, despite racing alongside an amateur driver in the form of Kenny Habul. Gounon later apologised to fellow Mercedes-AMG driver Maro Engel, with whom he had collided merely half an hour before the finish.

Racing record

Racing career summary

* Season still in progress.

Complete ADAC GT Masters results
(key) (Races in bold indicate pole position) (Races in italics indicate fastest lap)

* Season still in progress.

Complete GT World Challenge Europe Endurance Cup results

*Season still in progress.

Complete 24 Hours of Le Mans results

Complete WeatherTech SportsCar Championship results
(key) (Races in bold indicate pole position; results in italics indicate fastest lap)

References

External links

 
 

1994 births
Living people
People from Aubenas
French racing drivers
French F4 Championship drivers
Formula Renault Eurocup drivers
Formula Renault 2.0 NEC drivers
Sportspeople from Lyon
Blancpain Endurance Series drivers
ADAC GT Masters drivers
24 Hours of Spa drivers
24 Hours of Le Mans drivers
24 Hours of Daytona drivers
24H Series drivers
WeatherTech SportsCar Championship drivers
Super GT drivers
International GT Open drivers
British GT Championship drivers
Mercedes-AMG Motorsport drivers
Auto Sport Academy drivers
KTR drivers
AV Formula drivers
Meyer Shank Racing drivers
Karting World Championship drivers
Audi Sport drivers
Phoenix Racing drivers
Nürburgring 24 Hours drivers
Saintéloc Racing drivers
M-Sport drivers
Craft-Bamboo Racing drivers
French expatriate sportspeople in Andorra
Asian Le Mans Series drivers